Llera Municipality may refer to:
 Llera, Badajoz, Spain
 Llera, Tamaulipas, Mexico

Municipality name disambiguation pages